Stróża  is a village in the administrative district of Gmina Pcim, within Myślenice County, Lesser Poland Voivodeship, in southern Poland.

The village has a population of 2,900.

References

Villages in Myślenice County